Joshua Taylor Suggs (born April 26, 1989 in Las Cruces, New Mexico) is an American soccer player who currently plays for New Mexico United in the USL Championship. He can play as either a left back or as a centre half.

Career

Youth and Amateur
Suggs attended Las Cruces High School, and was a member of the New Mexico Olympic Development Program (ODP) State Team for five years, before going on to play four years of college soccer at Humboldt State University. With the Jacks he earned honorable mention All-CCAA honors as a sophomore in 2008, was an NSCAA Division II All-West Region third-team selection and a second-team All-CCAA honoree as a junior in 2009 and again as a senior in 2010.  He captained the team in his senior year in 2010.

Professional
Suggs turned professional when he signed with the expansion Los Angeles Blues now formally known as the Orange County Blues FC of the                                                                                                                                                    USL Professional League in February 2010. He made his professional debut on April 15, 2011 in a 3–0 victory over Sevilla Puerto Rico

He signed with San Jose Earthquakes of Major League Soccer on March 9, 2012.

On April 5, 2012 Suggs was loaned to NASL club Tampa Bay Rowdies for the 2012 season.

Suggs was waived by San Jose on June 28, 2012.

Colorado Springs Switchbacks FC
Suggs signed with Colorado Springs Switchbacks of the United Soccer League in January 2016. Suggs scored his first goal for the Colorado Springs Switchbacks in a 2–1 friendly victory against Air Force Falcon's Soccer team.

Career statistics

References

External links
 
 Humboldt State bio

1989 births
Living people
American soccer players
Association football defenders
Atlanta Silverbacks players
Colorado Springs Switchbacks FC players
New Mexico United players
North American Soccer League players
Orange County SC players
San Jose Earthquakes players
Soccer players from New Mexico
Sportspeople from Las Cruces, New Mexico
Tampa Bay Rowdies players
USL Championship players
Humboldt State Lumberjacks men's soccer players